Kavanz may refer to:
 Kavanz, Iranshahr
 Kavanz, Nik Shahr